Hyacinth Bernard Wenceslaus Morgan (11 September 1885 – 7 May 1956) was a Labour Party politician in the United Kingdom.  He was a Member of Parliament (MP) from 1929 to 1931, and 1940 to 1955.

He was born, of Irish descent, in Grenada, West Indies and came to the United Kingdom to study medicine at Glasgow University in 1904. While at University he was active in the Fabian Society and founded the students' Irish Nationalist Club. After qualifying, he worked in a number of Glasgow mental hospitals and then served as a doctor in the Royal Army Medical Corps during World War I in both France and England. He then entered general practice in London, initially at Greenwich, later Camberwell and finally at Paddington.

Political career

Morgan contested the South London constituency of the Camberwell North West at the 1922 general election, but lost by a wide margin to the National Liberal MP Thomas James Macnamara.  He stood again at the 1923 election, when Macnamara had re-joined the Liberal Party,  and lost by only 80 votes. In 1924, Sir Edward Taswell Campbel won the seat by only 194 votes. Morgan finally won the seat at the 1929 general election.

However, the Labour Party split at the 1931 general election over fiscal policy; Prime Minister Ramsay MacDonald had left the party to form a National Government with the support of the Conservative Party and some Liberals, and Labour's national share of the vote fell from 37% to 31%. In most seats, Liberal and Conservative candidates agreed a single candidate would stand against Labour. As a result, Labour retained only 52 of the 287 seats it had previously won in 1929. Morgan's Camberwell seat was such seat lost.

He did not stand for Parliament again until 1940, when the Labour MP William Kelly resigned his Rochdale seat. At the by-election in July 1940, Morgan was elected unopposed. He was then re-elected in 1945 with only a 10% majority. At the 1950 general election he moved to the safer Warrington seat, which he won with a comfortable 19% majority. He won re-election in 1951 and retired from the Parliament at the 1955 general election.

In the periods he was not serving as a Member Parliament, Morgan returned to the practice of medicine. In 1936 he worked with Charles Brook and other members of the Labour-affiliated Socialist Medical Association to found the Spanish Medical Aid Committee to provide supplies and a uniformed medical unit to the Republican side in the Spanish Civil War. He served as a member of the Confederation of Health Service Employees (COHSE) union National Executive Committee and COHSE's Medical Guild from 1946 to 1951. Morgan died in 1956, aged 70.

References

Sources

External links
 
Documents on Morgan's involvement in the Spanish Civil War from "Trabajadores: The Spanish Civil War through the eyes of organised labour", a digitised collection of more than 13,000 pages of documents from the archives of the British Trades Union Congress held in the Modern Records Centre, University of Warwick

1885 births
1956 deaths
British people of Irish descent
Labour Party (UK) MPs for English constituencies
People from Camberwell
People from Rochdale
UK MPs 1929–1931
UK MPs 1935–1945
UK MPs 1945–1950
UK MPs 1950–1951
UK MPs 1951–1955
Members of the Parliament of the United Kingdom for Rochdale
Members of the Fabian Society